Ali Ebrahimbeigi (born 19 May 1984) is an Iranian professional futsal player.

Honours

Club 
 Iranian Futsal Super League
 Runners-up (1): 2008–09 (Eram Kish)
 Iranian Futsal Hazfi Cup
 Champion (1): 2013–14 (Mahan Tandis)
 Iran Futsal's 1st Division
 Runners-up (1): 2016–17 (Ana Sanat)

References 

1984 births
Living people
People from Qom
Iranian men's futsal players
Almas Shahr Qom FSC players
Dabiri FSC players
Ana Sanat FC players
Sunich FSC players